Joseph Isaac Fleishaker (1954 – May 23, 2016) was an American character actor best known for his appearances in low-budget cult and horror comedy movies. In particular, those produced by New York-based independent film company Troma Entertainment, who have billed Fleishaker as "Troma's biggest action star", humorously alluding to his morbid obesity, which surpassed five hundred pounds.

Biography
Fleishaker was first cast in Troma's 1988 action-comedy Troma's War as an extra, where he played a member of a violent terrorist sect. Lloyd Kaufman, the film's director, was amused by Fleishaker's screen presence as an obese guerrilla soldier and ended up giving him more screen time throughout the film. Following Troma's War, Fleishaker struck up an ongoing partnership with Troma, having acted in every Kaufman-directed film from 1989 to 2006. These parts have ranged from background parts and short cameos to much larger supporting roles, such as The Toxic Avenger's sidekick Lardass in Citizen Toxie: The Toxic Avenger IV.

Outside of their films, Fleishaker became well-known to Troma fans for his numerous appearances in the company's many promotional videos and shorts, where he assumed the role of Troma co-president Michael Herz, who typically prefers to stay out of the public eye. Fleishaker's appearances as Herz were so frequent, many fans have continued to mistake him for the real Michael Herz.

In addition to his work with Troma, Fleishaker appeared at least twelve times as a bit player on Late Night/Late Show with David Letterman during the 1990s, acting in various comedy sketches.

He was later transferred to a physical rehabilitation center where he eventually lost 160 pounds though still couldn't retain the ability to walk. On June 3, 2014, a GoFundMe account was opened in Fleishaker's name, aiming to raise $50,000 to help cover his ongoing medical costs and continued treatment. The fundraiser failed, raising only $961 since the fundraiser opened.

Fleishaker died on May 25, 2016 at Montefiore Medical Center in the Bronx of a possible heart attack.

Filmography
 Sharknado 3 (2015) as movie patron who was decapitated by shark
 I Spill Your Guts (2012) as Dave the Landlord
 Poultrygeist: Night of the Chicken Dead (2006) as Jared (credited as Mega Herz)
 Tales from the Crapper (2004) as Michael Herz/500 Pound Candygramm
 UnConventional (2004) as Himself
 Parts of the Family (2003) as Fat Guy Watching Television (uncredited)
 Zombiegeddon (2003) as Caller #1 (voice only)
 Captain Bill and the Rockin' Buccaneers (2001) as Mr. McDoohan
 Citizen Toxie: The Toxic Avenger IV (2000) as Chester/Lardass
 Terror Firmer (1999) as Jacob Gelman
 Tromeo and Juliet (1996) as 1-900-HOT-HUNK
 Sgt. Kabukiman N.Y.P.D. (1991) as Josephs
 The Toxic Avenger Part III: The Last Temptation of Toxie (1989) as Apocalypse Inc. Executive
 The Toxic Avenger Part II (1989) as Apocalypse Inc. Executive
 Troma's War (1988) as Specially Trained Terrorist

TV shows
 Troma's Edge TV (2000) as Michael Herz/Lord Fartacus
 Late Night/Late Show with David Letterman - Himself/Various characters
 The Tromaville Café (1997) as Michael Herz/God

References

External links
 

1954 births
2016 deaths
American male film actors
American male television actors
21st-century American male actors